Aderus populneus is a species of ant-like leaf beetle in the family Aderidae. Native to the west Palaearctic (very common in England, it has been introduced in North America. Large eyes, pubescent antennae, 1.5-2mm

References

Further reading

 

Aderus populneus (Creutzer in Panzer, 1796)

External links

 

Aderidae
Articles created by Qbugbot
Beetles described in 1796